Marcin Jędrusiński  (born 28 September 1981) is a Polish former sprint athlete.

Jędrusiński represented Poland at the 2008 Summer Olympics in Beijing and the 2004 Olympics in Athens. He competed at the 4x100 metres relay together with Dariusz Kuc, Lukasz Chyla and Marcin Andrzej Nowak. In their qualification heat they did not finish due to a mistake in the baton exchange and they were eliminated. At the individual 200 metres he qualified second in his first round heat behind Shawn Crawford in a time of 20.64 seconds. He improved his time in the second round to 20.58 seconds, but only finished fourth behind Brendan Christian, Churandy Martina and Kristof Beyens. His time was not enough to advance to the semi finals.

Achievements
 European Championships
2nd (silver medal) in 2006 - 4 × 100 m (39.05)
 European Cup
3rd in 2001 – 4 × 100 m (39.00)
3rd in 2003 – 200 m (20.53)
2nd in 2003 – 4 × 100 m (38.45)
2nd in 2004 – 4 × 100 m (38.68)
1st in 2006 – 4 × 100 m (39.07)
2nd in 2008 - 4 × 100 m (38.61)
 European Youth Championships
1st (gold medal) in 2001 – 200 m (20.94)
2nd (silver medal) in 2003 – 200 m (20.39)
 World Junior Championships
2nd (silver medal) in 2000 – 200 m (20.87)
 European Junior Championships
2nd in 1999 – 4 × 100 m (39.67)
 Military World Games
1st in 1999 – 4 × 400 m (3:02.78)
1st in 2007 – 200 m (20.70)
2nd in 2007 - 4 × 100 m (39.52)

References

External links
 
 
 
 
 

1981 births
Living people
Polish male sprinters
Athletes (track and field) at the 2004 Summer Olympics
Athletes (track and field) at the 2008 Summer Olympics
Olympic athletes of Poland
Sportspeople from Wrocław
European Athletics Championships medalists
Śląsk Wrocław athletes